"Hang an Ornament" is a song by American indie rock bands Grandaddy and Band of Horses, released as a single on December 17, 2014.

Release 
The single is the first collaboration released between Grandaddy and Band of Horses. With the release of the song, Band of Horses announced that Grandaddy’s Jason Lytle would be producing their next album, "Why Are You OK."

References 

2014 singles
American Christmas songs
2014 songs